GMS syndrome is a syndrome characterised by goniodysgenesis, intellectual disability, and short stature.

References

External links 

Genetic disorders with no OMIM
Syndromes affecting stature